The Namibian Ministry of Finance (MOF) was established at Namibian independence in 1990. The first Namibian minister of finance was German Namibian Otto Herrigel. The  finance minister is Iipumbu Shiimi, a former governor of the Bank of Namibia.

Ministers
All finance ministers in chronological order are:

See also
Economy of Namibia

References

External links
Ministry of Finance

Finance
Finance
Economy of Namibia
1990 establishments in Namibia